Aeroflot Flight 721 was a scheduled domestic passenger flight between Moscow and Yuzhno-Sakhalinsk in the Russian SFSR.  On Wednesday, 2 September 1964, the aircraft flying this route, an Ilyushin Il-18V, crashed into the side of a hill on approach to Yuzhno-Sakhalinsk, killing 87 of the 93 people on board.  At the time of the accident, it was the deadliest Il-18 crash and the deadliest aviation accident on Russian soil.

Aircraft
The aircraft involved in the accident was an Ilyushin Il-18V turboprop airliner registered CCCP-75531 to the Krasnoyarsk Civil Aviation Directorate of Aeroflot.  At the time of the accident, it had only been in service for about a year and had logged merely 1,269 total flight hours and 358 pressurization cycles.

Crew 
Nine crew members were aboard the flight.  The cockpit crew consisted of:
 Captain Anatoly Andrevich Smirnov
 Co-pilot Boris G. Stepanov
 Navigator Anatoly Davydovich Gilinsky 
 Navigator-in-training Ivan Vasilievich Ivanov
 Flight engineer Arkady Kalayda
 Radio operator Yevgeny Petrovich Ipatov
Flight attendants Anastasia Tsebak, Lyubov Orekhova, and Nikolay Filatov worked in the cabin.  All nine crew members perished in the crash.

Synopsis

Flight 721's route led it eastward across Russia from Moscow to Yuzhno-Sakhalinsk, with stopovers in Khabarovsk and Krasnoyarsk.  The flight changed crews at Krasnoyarsk airport and proceeded with the flight to Khabarovsk without incident.

At 20:00 the flight departed Khabarovsk en route to the final destination, Yuzhno-Sakhalinsk, carrying 84 passengers, including 17 children. The flight went without incident until it began descent to Yuzhno. At 21:05 the Il-18 reported its altitude to be  and continued its flight towards the non-directional beacon. The air traffic controller warned the crew of an irregular southeasterly wind at a speed of 14.4 km/h in the airport area, and instructed them to take a landing course on a bearing of 10° (to the south). The crew responded by twice requesting to land on the shortest route, which was at a bearing of 190° (from the north). The controller refused their request and told them to follow the first route towards the beacon while at an altitude of 1500 meters. The crew again requested permission to land the shortest approach on a bearing of 190°. The controller asked the aircraft if they had enough time to do so, to which the crew answered in the affirmative. The controller relented and gave the flight permission to perform a visual approach with a right turn for the approach on a bearing of 190° and the crew confirmed receiving the permission.

The crew began a left turn of 100° to switch course after doing so the Il-18 landing gear was lowered and decreased the rate of descent to 36 km/h. It would only be safe to occupy an altitude of 600 meters once the aircraft was 12.7 km from the front of the runway. The weather was clear but was quite dark out when the Il-18 was preparing for landing. When the crew heard the command to report when they had reached 600 meters when they were still at an altitude of 1200 meters, seeing the airport lights and not further trying to calculate their position, the crew thought they were closer to the airport than anticipated and began the descent to 600 meters. The crew did not notice at the time that their bearing was at 140° (which became 151° in the process of turning) was well off from the 190° needed for the landing. When the controller informed them that he had lost the flight from radar. The controller did not notice, and hence did not inform the crew that their bearing was significantly off from the 190° for beginning the straight-in landing.

When the crew reported reaching an altitude of 600 meters the air traffic controller, still not understanding that the aircraft was not near the point where it was safe to fly at that altitude, instructed the aircraft to descend to 400 meters thinking it ready for final approach. Debris from the accident spread out across a 250-meter distance; a fire broke out in the remains of the aircraft and destroyed much of what remained of the airliner. All six survivors, which included three children, were seriously injured.

Causes 
The official report cited pilot error and poor in-flight planning as the cause of the accident; the crew initiated descent prematurely and apparently did not have sufficient knowledge of approach conditions, and these factors combined ultimately led to the crash. The commands given by the air traffic controller at the times give were noted to have misled the crew into thinking they were closer to the runway than they actually were.

References

1964 in the Soviet Union
Aviation accidents and incidents in 1964
Airliner accidents and incidents involving controlled flight into terrain
Airliner accidents and incidents caused by pilot error
Aviation accidents and incidents in the Soviet Union
Accidents and incidents involving the Ilyushin Il-18
721
September 1964 events in Europe